Events in the year 2019 in Belarus.

Incumbents
 President: Alexander Lukashenko
 Prime Ministers: Syarhey Rumas

Events

Sports
January 21–27: The 2019 European Figure Skating Championships were held in Minsk.
Juni 21–30: 2019 European Games are hosted by the city of Minsk.

Deaths

2 January – Jerzy Turonek, Polish-Belarusian historian (b. 1929).

4 February – Leu Mazurkevich, football player and manager (b. 1939).

9 February – Siamion Domash, politician (b. 1950).

19 April – Renald Knysh, artistic gymnastics coach (b. 1931).

References

 
2010s in Belarus
Years of the 21st century in Belarus
Belarus
Belarus